Dubliners is a collection of fifteen short stories by James Joyce, first published in 1914. It presents a naturalistic depiction of Irish middle class life in and around Dublin in the early years of the 20th century.

The stories were written when Irish nationalism was at its peak, and a search for a national identity and purpose was raging; at a crossroads of history and culture, Ireland was jolted by various converging ideas and influences.  They centre on Joyce's idea of an epiphany (a moment where a character experiences a life-changing self-understanding or illumination) and the theme of paralysis (Joyce felt Irish nationalism stagnated cultural progression, placing Dublin at the heart of a regressive movement). The first three stories in the collection are narrated by child protagonists,  while the subsequent stories are written in the third person and deal with the lives and concerns of progressively older people, in line with Joyce's division of the collection into childhood, adolescence, maturity, and public life. Many of the characters in Dubliners later appeared in minor roles in Joyce's novel Ulysses.

Publication history
Between 1905, when Joyce first sent a manuscript to a publisher, and 1914, when the book was finally published (on June 15), Joyce submitted the book 18 times to a total of 15 publishers. The London house of Grant Richards agreed to publish it in 1905. Its printer, however, refused to set one of the stories ("Two Gallants"), and Richards then began to press Joyce to remove a number of other passages that he claimed the printer also refused to set. Under protest, Joyce eventually agreed to some of the requested changes, but Richards ended up backing out of the deal anyway. Joyce thereupon resubmitted the manuscript to other publishers, and, about three years later (1909), he found a willing candidate in Maunsel & Roberts of Dublin. A similar controversy developed, and Maunsel too refused to publish the collection, even threatening to sue Joyce for printing costs already incurred. Joyce offered to pay the printing costs himself if the sheets were turned over to him and he was allowed to complete the job elsewhere and distribute the book, but, when he arrived at the printers, they refused to surrender the sheets and burned them the next day, though Joyce managed to save one copy, which he obtained "by ruse". He returned to submitting the manuscript to other publishers, and in 1914 Grant Richards once again agreed to publish the book, using the page proofs saved from Maunsel as copy.

The stories
 "The Sisters" – After the priest Father Flynn dies, a young boy who was close to him hears some less-than-flattering stories about the father.
 "An Encounter" – Two schoolboys playing truant encounter a perverted, middle-aged man.
 "Araby" – A boy falls in love with the sister of his friend, but fails in his quest to buy her a worthy gift from the Araby Bazaar.
 "Eveline" – A young woman weighs her decision to flee Ireland with a sailor.
 "After the Race" – College student Jimmy Doyle tries to fit in with his wealthy friends.
 "Two Gallants" – Lenehan wanders around Dublin to kill time while waiting to hear if his friend, Corley, was able to con a maid out of some money.
 "The Boarding House" – Mrs Mooney successfully manoeuvres her daughter Polly into an upwardly mobile marriage with her lodger Mr Doran.
 "A Little Cloud" – Little Chandler's dinner with his old friend Ignatius Gallaher, who left home to become a journalist in London, casts fresh light on his own failed literary dreams.
 "Counterparts" – Farrington, a lumbering alcoholic scrivener, takes out his frustration in pubs and on his son Tom.
 "Clay" – Maria, a spinster who works in the kitchen at a large laundry, celebrates Halloween with a man she cared for as a child and his family.
 "A Painful Case" – Mr Duffy rebuffs the advances of his friend Mrs Sinico, and, four years later, discovers he condemned her to loneliness and death.
 "Ivy Day in the Committee Room" – Several paid canvassers for a minor politician discuss the memory of Charles Stewart Parnell.
 "A Mother" – To win a place of pride for her daughter Kathleen in the Irish Revival, Mrs. Kearney arranges for the girl to be accompanist at a series of poorly planned concerts, but her efforts backfire.
 "Grace" – Mr Kernan passes out and falls down the stairs at a bar, so his friends attempt to convince him to come to a Catholic retreat to help him reform.
 "The Dead" – After a holiday party thrown by his aunts and cousin, Gabriel Conroy's wife, Gretta, tells him about a boyfriend from her youth, and he has an epiphany about life and death and human connection. (At 15–16,000 words, this story has been classified as a novella.)

Style 
When discussing Joyce's Dubliners, there are two types of critics that are often at the forefront of the conversation: the "Realists" and the "Symbolists." The Realists view Dubliners as the most simple of Joyce's works, which often causes them to disregard the revolutionary nature of the work. The symbolists instead neglect the rebellious meanings behind Joyce's symbols. While some choose only one side to argue, others believe that Dubliners completely defies any form of characterization. Without any clear evidence of thematic unity, logic of plot, or closure, Joyce prevents any conclusive critical analysis. As Sonja Bašić argues, the book "should be seen not just as a realist/naturalist masterpiece, but as a significant stepping-stone integrated into the modernist structure of Joyce's mature work."

It is argued that the narrators in Dubliners rarely mediate, which means that there are limited descriptions of their thoughts and emotions, a practice said to accompany narratorial invisibility where the narrator sees instead of tells. While some point to Joyce's use of free indirect discourse as a way to understand his characters, he often obscures the reliability of his characters in a way that would make any kind of analysis very difficult. As Richard Ellmann has argued, "Joyce claims importance by claiming nothing." His characters' personalities can only be observed because they are not explicitly told.

The collection progresses chronologically, beginning with stories of youth and progressing in age to culminate in "The Dead". 

Emphasis is laid upon the specific geographic details of Dublin, for example, road names and buildings feature extensively.

Media adaptations
 Hugh Leonard adapted six stories as Dublin One, which was staged at the Gate Theatre, Dublin, in 1963.
 In 1987, John Huston directed a film adaptation of "The Dead", written for the screen by his son Tony and starring his daughter Anjelica as Mrs. Conroy.
 In October 1998, BBC Radio 4 broadcast dramatisations by various writers of "A Painful Case", "After the Race", "Two Gallants", "The Boarding House", "A Little Cloud", and "Counterparts". The series ended with a dramatization of "The Dead", which was first broadcast in 1994 under the title "Distant Music". The broadcasts were accompanied by nighttime abridged readings of other stories from Dubliners, starting with "Ivy Day in the Committee Room" (in two parts, read by T. P. McKenna), and continuing with "The Sisters", "An Encounter", "Araby", "Eveline", and "Clay" (all read by Barry McGovern).
 In 1999, a short film adaptation of "Araby" was produced and directed by Dennis Courtney.
 In 2000, a Tony Award-winning musical adaptation of "The Dead" premiered, written by Richard Nelson and Shaun Davey and directed by Nelson.
 In April 2012, Stephen Rea read "The Dead" on RTÉ Radio 1.
 In February 2014, Stephen Rea read all fifteen stories spread across twenty 13-minute segments of Book at Bedtime on BBC Radio 4.
 In July 2014, Irish actor Carl Finnegan released a modern retelling of "Two Gallants" as a short film. Finnegan wrote the script with Darren McGrath and also produced, directed, and performed the role of Corley in the film.

References

Further reading
General
Ellmann, Richard.  James Joyce.  Oxford University Press, 1959, revised edition 1983.
Burgess, Anthony. Here Comes Everybody: An Introduction to James Joyce for the Ordinary Reader (1965); also published as Re Joyce.
Burgess, Anthony. Joysprick: An Introduction to the Language of James Joyce (1973)

Dubliners
 Benstock, Bernard.  Narrative Con/Texts in Dubliners.  Urbana: University of Illinois Press, 1994.  .
 Bloom, Harold.  James Joyce's Dubliners.  New York: Chelsea House, 1988.  .
 Bosinelli Bollettieri, Rosa Maria and Harold Frederick Mosher, eds.  ReJoycing: New Readings of Dubliners.  Lexington: University Press of Kentucky, 1998.  .
 Frawley, Oona.  A New & Complex Sensation: Essays on Joyce's Dubliners.  Dublin: Lilliput, 2004.  .
 Hart, Clive.  James Joyce's Dubliners: Critical Essays.  London: Faber, 1969.  .
 Ingersoll, Earl G.  Engendered Trope in Joyce's Dubliners.  Carbondale: Southern Illinois UP, 1996.  .
 Norris, Margot, ed.  Dubliners: Authoritative Text, Contexts, Criticism.  New York: Norton, 2006.  .
 Thacker, Andrew, ed.  Dubliners: James Joyce.  New Casebook Series.  New York: Palgrave Macmillan, 2006.  .

External links

 
 
 Spark Notes
 Dubliners at the British Library
 Grant Richards Ltd, London, 1914 digitised copy of first edition from Internet Archive
 

1914 short story collections
Modernist short stories
Short story collections by James Joyce
Irish short story collections
20th-century short stories
Dublin (city) in fiction
Saint Patrick's Day fiction